The 2018 Calder Cup playoffs of the American Hockey League began on April 19, 2018, with the playoff format that was introduced in 2016. The sixteen teams that qualified, eight from each conference, played best-of-five series in the division semifinals, with the playoffs continuing with best-of-seven series for the division finals, conference finals, and Calder Cup finals.

A Division finals game between the Lehigh Valley Phantoms and the Charlotte Checkers became the longest game in AHL history by going 86:48 into overtime when Alex Krushelnyski of the Phantoms scored the winning 2–1 goal. The game started at 7:03 pm on May 9 and ended at 1:09 am on May 10. The Checkers had 95 shots on goal and Alex Lyon would finish with 94 saves, while Alex Nedeljkovic would finish with 51 saves on 53 shots. The previous record of 82:58 into overtime was set in 2008, also between the AHL affiliates of the Philadelphia Flyers and the Carolina Hurricanes.

The Toronto Marlies won their first Calder Cup, beating the Texas Stars four games to three in the finals.

Playoff seeds
After the 2017–18 AHL regular season, 16 teams qualified for the playoffs. The top four teams in each division ranked by points percentage (points earned divided by points available) qualify for the 2018 Calder Cup Playoffs. The Toronto Marlies were the first team to clinch a playoff spot and went on to claim the regular season title with four games remaining.

Eastern Conference

Atlantic Division
 Lehigh Valley Phantoms – 104 points (.684)
 Wilkes-Barre/Scranton Penguins – 99 points (.651)
 Charlotte Checkers – 96 points (.632)
 Providence Bruins – 95 points (.625)

North Division
 Toronto Marlies– 112 points (.737)
 Syracuse Crunch – 100 points (.658)
 Rochester Americans – 91 points (.599)
 Utica Comets – 88 points (.579)

Western Conference

Central Division
 Chicago Wolves – 95 points (.625)
 Grand Rapids Griffins – 93 points (.612)
 Manitoba Moose – 92 points (.605)
 Rockford IceHogs – 88 points (.579)

Pacific Division
 Tucson Roadrunners – 90 points (.662)
 Texas Stars – 90 points (.592)
 Ontario Reign – 79 points (.581)
 San Jose Barracuda – 76 points (.559), 33

Bracket

Division semifinals 
Note 1: Home team is listed first.
Note 2: Higher-seeded team had the choice of games 1, 2, and 5 at home or games 3, 4, and 5 at home.

Eastern Conference

(A1) Lehigh Valley Phantoms vs. (A4) Providence Bruins

(A2) Wilkes-Barre/Scranton Penguins vs. (A3) Charlotte Checkers

(N1) Toronto Marlies vs. (N4) Utica Comets

(N2) Syracuse Crunch vs. (N3) Rochester Americans

Western Conference

(C1) Chicago Wolves vs. (C4) Rockford IceHogs

(C2) Grand Rapids Griffins vs. (C3) Manitoba Moose

(P1) Tucson Roadrunners vs. (P4) San Jose Barracuda

(P2) Texas Stars vs. (P3) Ontario Reign

Division finals 
Note: Home team is listed first.

Eastern Conference

(A1) Lehigh Valley Phantoms vs. (A3) Charlotte Checkers

(N1) Toronto Marlies vs. (N2) Syracuse Crunch

Western Conference

(C3) Manitoba Moose vs. (C4) Rockford IceHogs

(P1) Tucson Roadrunners vs. (P2) Texas Stars

Conference finals 
Note: Home team is listed first.

Eastern Conference

(N1) Toronto Marlies vs. (A1) Lehigh Valley Phantoms

Western Conference

(P2) Texas Stars vs. (C4) Rockford IceHogs

Calder Cup Finals 
Note: Home team is listed first.

(N1) Toronto Marlies vs. (P2) Texas Stars

Playoff statistical leaders

Leading skaters

These are the top ten skaters based on points. If there is a tie in points, goals take precedence over assists.

GP = Games played; G = Goals; A = Assists; Pts = Points; +/– = Plus-minus; PIM = Penalty minutes

Leading goaltenders 

This is a combined table of the top five goaltenders based on goals against average and the top five goaltenders based on save percentage with at least 240 minutes played. The table is initially sorted by goals against average, with the criterion for inclusion in bold.

GP = Games played; W = Wins; L = Losses; SA = Shots against; GA = Goals against; GAA = Goals against average; SV% = Save percentage; SO = Shutouts; TOI = Time on ice (in minutes)

References

External links
AHL official site

Calder Cup playoffs
Calder Cup Playoffs